The 1996–97 National Football League, also known as the Philips National League for sponsorship reasons, was the inaugural season of the National Football League. The tournament began on 17 December 1996 and concluded on 16 March 1997. Before the commencement, the All India Football Federation maintained that it would be a semi-professional tournament for the first two years.

Philips India was the main sponsor for the tournament and a total prize money of 1.5 crore was announced; 35 lakh to the winner. Twelve teams took part in the competition, which was played in two round robin stages: a preliminary group stage featuring two groups of six teams each played in Calcutta and Goa, and a main stage featuring the top four from each group played after a gap of three weeks following the first. East Bengal were the favorites to win the competition by virtue of their victories in the Federation Cup and the Calcutta League earlier that season. However, in a closely fought second stage mostly between JCT Mills and Churchill Brothers, the former sealed the title on the final day with a win over Dempo, courtesy a hat trick by Bhaichung Bhutia. Air India's Godfrey Pereira was named the best player of the league and JCT Mills' Sukhwinder Singh, the best manager. JCT Mills also won the Fairplay Trophy, which carried a purse of 2.5 lakh.

The bottom two clubs in each group would not take part in the next edition, although Mohun Bagan would play the following season.

Overview 
The first match of the inaugural season of the National Football League kicked off at around 5:45 p.m. (IST), an hour after the scheduled time, on 17 December 1996 between East Bengal and Mohammedan Sporting at the Salt Lake Stadium in Calcutta. It was inaugurated by then India's Prime Minister H. D. Deve Gowda. East Bengal defeated Mohammedan Sporting 2–1 with Raman Vijayan scoring a brace for his team; the first goal coming in the 10th minute.

Teams

Stadia and locations

Group stage
Top four advance to the Championship stage.

Group A

Group B

Championship stage

Season statistics

Hat-tricks

5 Player scored five goals
Note: (H) – Home; (A) – Away

1996-97 Season Roll of Honour

References

External links 
 Philips National League at Rec.Sport.Soccer Statistics Foundation

National Football League (India) seasons
1996–97 in Indian football
India